Russell School, also known as Cain's School, is a historic Rosenwald school located near Durham, Durham County, North Carolina.  It was built in 1926–1927, and is a one-story, front-gabled weatherboarded building.  It features a center projecting wing containing the original industrial room, flanking recessed entrances, and two large classrooms. Construction of the school was made possible due to the notable efforts of Durham Jeanes supervisor Carrie Thomas Jordan. The school closed in 1945 and has been owned by Cain's Chapel Baptist Church and used as a community center.

It was listed on the National Register of Historic Places in 2009.

References

African-American history of North Carolina
School buildings on the National Register of Historic Places in North Carolina
Rosenwald schools in North Carolina
School buildings completed in 1927
Buildings and structures in Durham County, North Carolina
National Register of Historic Places in Durham County, North Carolina
1927 establishments in North Carolina